Plestiodon kuchinoshimensis is a species of lizard which is endemic to Japan.

References

kuchinoshimensis
Reptiles of Japan
Reptiles described in 2014
Taxa named by Tsutomu Hikida